New Harmony is an unincorporated community in Bledsoe County, Tennessee, United States.  It lies in eastern Bledsoe County, south of Summer City and southeast of the city of Pikeville, the county seat of Bledsoe County. New Harmony is located along Tennessee State Route 443 (New Harmony Road).

References

Unincorporated communities in Bledsoe County, Tennessee
Unincorporated communities in Tennessee